"A Pair of Brown Eyes" is a single by The Pogues, released on 18 March 1985. The single was their first to make the UK Top 100, peaking at Number 72. It featured on the band's second album, Rum Sodomy & the Lash, and was composed by Pogues front man Shane MacGowan. Its melody is loosely based on that of “Wild Mountain Thyme" (also known as "Will Ye Go Lassie Go"), a song by Francis McPeake in a traditional Irish folk style.

The song references the Johnny Cash version of the song "A Thing Called Love": "And on the jukebox Johnny sang / About a thing called love". It also references Irish country music singers Ray Lynam and Philomena Begley's version of "My Elusive Dreams": "While Ray and Philomena sang / Of my elusive dream".

Music video
The music video for the single was directed in 1985 by Alex Cox and was set in a Nineteen Eighty-Four-esque Britain with Margaret Thatcher in the place of Big Brother as a supreme, god-like authoritarian figure. The video featured roles played by band members as well as a cameo by the record's producer Elvis Costello.

Critical reception 
The song was ranked number 9 among the "Tracks of the Year" for 1985 by NME.

References

1985 singles
The Pogues songs
Songs written by Shane MacGowan
1985 songs
Stiff Records singles
Song recordings produced by Elvis Costello